James Ernest Wharton (October 4, 1899January 19, 1990) was an American attorney and politician.  A Republican, he served as a member of the United States House of Representatives from New York from 1951 to 1965.

Biography

James Ernest Wharton was born in Binghamton, New York on October 4, 1899 to James H. Wharton and Mae Dibble. He attended the public schools of Richmondville and graduated from Richmondville High School. After his high school graduation, Wharton attended Albany Law School.

During World War I, Wharton joined the Student Army Training Corps. He enlisted as a private in October 1918, and was discharged in December, following the Armistice of 11 November 1918 that ended the war. Wharton then completed his studies at Albany Law School, from which he graduated in 1919.

Wharton worked for Travelers Insurance from 1920 until 1929. He attained admission to the bar in 1923 and commenced a law practice in 1929. A Republican, Wharton was the district attorney of Schoharie County, New York from 1932 until 1941. From 1941 to 1951, he served as the county's surrogate, family, and county court judge.

He was elected to the U.S. House in 1950 and served from January 3, 1951, until January 3, 1965. In 1960, his Democratic opponent was Gore Vidal, whom Wharton defeated to win a fifth term. In 1964, he was defeated for reelection by Democrat Joseph Y. Resnick. After leaving Congress, Wharton resumed the practice of law and became involved in real estate development.

Wharton voted in favor of the Civil Rights Acts of 1957, 1960, and 1964, as well as the 24th Amendment to the U.S. Constitution.

He died in Summit, New York on January 19, 1990. He was buried at Cobleskill Rural Cemetery in Cobleskill.

Wharton was first married to Freda Boynton (1899-1979).  They divorced and he married Marion Turner (1913-2006). With his first wife, Wharton was the father of a daughter, Beverly Wharton Radez.

See also

References

External links
 Retrieved on 2008-01-29

1899 births
1990 deaths
Politicians from Binghamton, New York
United States Army soldiers
United States Army personnel of World War I
Albany Law School alumni
New York (state) state court judges
Republican Party members of the United States House of Representatives from New York (state)
20th-century American judges
Lawyers from Binghamton, New York
County district attorneys in New York (state)
20th-century American politicians
20th-century American lawyers